Angioni is an Italian surname. Notable people with the surname include:

 Giulio Angioni (1939–2017), Italian writer and anthropologist
 Paolo Angioni (born 1938), Italian equestrian
 Stefano Angioni (born 1939), Italian equestrian

Italian-language surnames
Surnames of Italian origin